Richard Cobden was launched in 1845 in Dundee. She first appeared in Lloyd's Register (LR) in 1845.

On 22 October 1850 Richard Cobden, Archibald, master, caught fire about 100 miles from Réunion while sailing from Calcutta to London. , Stephens, master, rescued the crew and took them into Saint Helena.

Citations

1845 ships
Ships built in Dundee
Age of Sail merchant ships of England
Maritime incidents in October 1850